Herbert I. Sorin (August 1, 1900 – August 26, 1994) was an American lawyer and politician from New York.

Life
He was born on August 1, 1900, in New York City, the son of Herbert Sorin (died 1930) and Rae Goldberg Sorin (1882–1966). He attended Public School No. 149 and Brooklyn Commercial High School. He graduated B.C.S. from New York University School of Commerce; and LL.B. from New York University School of Law. He was an Assistant U.S. Attorney for the Eastern District of New York for nine years.

Sorin was a member of the New York State Senate (10th D.) from 1949 to 1959, sitting in the 167th, 168th, 169th, 170th, 171st and 172nd New York State Legislatures. On September 18, 1959, he was appointed as a City Magistrate; and in 1962 became a Judge of the New York City Criminal Court.

He died on August 26, 1994; and was buried at the Mount Judah Cemetery in Ridgewood, Queens.

References

External links
 

1900 births
1994 deaths
Democratic Party New York (state) state senators
Politicians from Brooklyn
New York University School of Law alumni
New York (state) state court judges
20th-century American lawyers
20th-century American judges
20th-century American politicians